Ola Torkel Petersson (born 19 August 1969 in Lund, Sweden) is a Swedish actor and comedian.

Selected filmography
1999: Zero Tolerance (Swedish title: Noll tolerans)
2000: Jalla! Jalla!
2002: Old Men in New Cars (Danish title: Gamle mænd i nye biler)
2003: Kopps
2006: Offside
2008: Patrik, Age 1.5
2009: Nasty Old People
2010: Balls
2014: Jönssonligan – Den perfekta stöten (Reboot of Jönssonligan)
2015: Eternal Summer
2018: Halvdan Viking

References

External links

1969 births
Swedish male actors
Living people